Kelly-Anne Wilson (born 7 February 1975) is a South African fencer. She competed in the women's individual and team épée events at the 2004 Summer Olympics.

References

External links
 

1975 births
Fencers at the 2004 Summer Olympics
Living people
Olympic fencers of South Africa
South African female épée fencers
21st-century South African women